The Rumyantsev family were Russian counts prominent in Russian imperial politics in the 18th and early 19th centuries. The family claimed descent from the boyar Rumyanets who broke his oath of allegiance and surrendered Nizhny Novgorod to Vasily I of Moscow in 1391.

The first Rumyantsev to gain prominence, Alexander Ivanovich (1680–1749), served as ordinary of Peter the Great in the Preobrazhensky regiment. In 1720 he married Countess Maria Matveyeva, daughter and heiress of Count Andrey Matveyev. Peter's daughter Elizabeth recalled Rumyantsev to active service and made him a hereditary count as well as Governor of Kiev.

Their son Pyotr Alexandrovich (1725–96) took his name from that of the ruling Emperor and was rumored to have been his natural son. In 1761 he besieged and took the Prussian fortress of Kolberg, thus clearing for Russian armies the path to Berlin. During Catherine II's reign he served as Governor General of Little Russia, or Ukraine. After crossing the Danube River into Bulgaria and signing the advantageous Treaty of Küçük Kaynarca with the Turks in 1774, Rumyantsev was promoted Field Marshal and was given the victory title of Zadunaisky (literally, "Transdanubian").

His sister, Praskovja Bruce (1729–85), was the confidant and lady-in-waiting of Catherine the Great, who entrusted her with her private affairs and was known in history as the so-called "l'éprouveuse" (= "the (lovers) tester").

During the Napoleonic wars, Zadunaisky's son Nikolay Petrovich (1754–1826) held the highest offices of state, including those of Minister of Commerce (1802–11), President of the State Council (1810–12), Foreign Minister (1808–12), and Chancellor of the Russian Empire. On receiving the news of Napoleon's invasion of Russia (1812), he suffered a stroke and lost his hearing. He died childless, and the family became extinct soon thereafter.

Russian noble families